Hudson Strode (October 31, 1892 – September 22, 1976) was an author and professor of creative writing at the University of Alabama. He taught at the University of Alabama from 1916 until his retirement in 1963.  His creative writing classes gained international fame for the literary successes achieved by his students.  Strode's students published over 55 novels and 101 short stories.  One of Strode's students was the author Borden Deal.

Early life and education
Strode was born in Cairo, Illinois, but moved to Demopolis, Alabama at the age of twelve.  He received his undergraduate degree from the University of Alabama in 1913, and a Master of Arts degree from Columbia University in 1914. While at the University of Alabama, he was a member of the Blackfriars drama group, and studied dramatics under Frederick D. Losey. After Losey's tenure, Strode would go on to oversee Blackfriars.

Career
Strode wrote several books on Scandinavian and Caribbean countries before turning to biography.

His best known accomplishment is his three-volume biography of Jefferson Davis published in 1964. A leading scholarly journal critically reviewed it, stressing Strode's political biases:

His [Jefferson Davis's] enemies are devils, and his friends, like Davis himself, have been canonized. Strode not only attempts to sanctify Davis but also the Confederate point of view, and this study should be relished by those vigorously sympathetic with the Lost Cause.

According to one commentator, Strode's views on the American Civil War were so pro-Confederate that they approach being Neo-Confederate in nature.

In 1961 Gustaf VI Adolf of Sweden bestowed on Dr. Strode the Order of the North Star in recognition of his contributions toward strengthening the cultural relations between the United States and Sweden.

Published works
(1932) Story of Bermuda
(1934) The Pageant of Cuba
(1937) South by Thunderbird 
(1939) Immortal Lyrics
(1941) Finland Forever
(1944) Timeless Mexico, a History 
(1944) Spring Harvest: A Collection of Stories from Alabama
(1947) Now in Mexico, a Book of Travel
(1949) Sweden: Model for a World
(1951) Denmark is a Lovely Land
(1955) Jefferson Davis, Volume I : American Patriot
(1959) Jefferson Davis, Volume II: Confederate President
(1964) Jefferson Davis, Volume III: Tragic Hero
(1966) Jefferson Davis: Private Letters 1823-1889, Editor
(1973) Ultimates in the Far East: Travels in the Orient and India
(1975) The Eleventh House: Memoirs

Notes

External link

Writers from Alabama
University of Alabama alumni
Columbia University alumni
University of Alabama faculty
People from Cairo, Illinois
1892 births
1976 deaths
20th-century American biographers
People from Demopolis, Alabama
Order of the Polar Star
Neo-Confederates